In mathematics, particularly abstract algebra, a binary operation • on a set is flexible if it satisfies the flexible identity:
 
for any two elements a and b of the set.  A magma (that is, a set equipped with a binary operation) is flexible if the binary operation with which it is equipped is flexible.  Similarly, a nonassociative algebra is flexible if its multiplication operator is flexible.

Every commutative or associative operation is flexible, so flexibility becomes important for binary operations that are neither commutative nor associative, e.g. for the multiplication of sedenions, which are not even alternative.

In 1954, Richard D. Schafer examined the algebras generated by the Cayley–Dickson process over a field and showed that they satisfy the flexible identity.

Examples

Besides associative algebras, the following classes of nonassociative algebras are flexible:

 Alternative algebras
 Lie algebras
 Jordan algebras (which are commutative)
 Okubo algebras

Similarly, the following classes of nonassociative magmas are flexible:

 Alternative magmas
 Semigroups (which are associative magmas, and which are also alternative)

The sedenions, and all algebras constructed from these by iterating the Cayley–Dickson construction, are also flexible.

See also 
Zorn ring
Maltsev algebra

References

 

Non-associative algebras
Properties of binary operations